The Pravara Rural Education Society (PRES) was established in July 1964 at Pravara, Loni, a large village in Maharashtra state in India. It is located between Pune to the South and Nashik to the North. The founder, Padamshri Vitthalrao Vikhe Patil, was a leader of the cooperative movement.  The society's first school was an English medium school.

Padam Bhushan Sh Balasaheb Vikhe Patil is the chairman of the society, and [Rajendra Bhane Patil] is the executive chairman.

Progress
The Pravara Rural Education Society operates 11 technical colleges, 6 senior colleges, 6 English medium schools including a Sainik School and 32 Marathi medium schools. In all, over 40,000 students are presently on the rolls of these institutions.

Major institutions

Technical colleges
Pravara Rural Engineering College, Loni
 Sri Visvesvaraya Institute of Technology, Chincholi, Nashik.
 Padamshri Vitthalrao Vikhe Patil Institute of Technology & Engineering, Loni
Pravara Rural College of Pharmacy, Loni
 Pravara Women's College of Pharmacy, Chincholi
 Pravara Rural College of Architecture, Loni
 College of Pharmacy, Chincholi
Industrial Training Institute, and Women Industrial Training Institute, Loni
 HAL-Pravara Aviation Institute, Ozar, Nashik

Senior colleges
 Padamshri Vikhe Patil College of Arts, Science and Commerce, Pravaranagar
 Arts, Commerce and Science College, Satral
 Pravara Women's College of Home Science and BCA, Loni
 College of Agricultural Biotechnology, Loni
 Pravara Rural College of Education, Loni
 College of Physical Education, Loni

English medium schools
 Pravara Public School, Pravaranagar
 Pravara Central Public School, Pravaranagar
 Padamshri Vitthalrao Vikhe Patil Sainik School, Loni
 Pravara Girls English Medium School & Junior College, Loni
 Pravara High School, Kolhar
Padmashri Balasaheb Vikhe Patil International School, Loni

References

Educational organisations in Maharashtra
Rural development organisations in India
1964 establishments in Maharashtra